Paul Gagné may refer to:

Paul Gagné (ice hockey) (born 1962), Canadian former professional ice hockey player
Paul Gagné (translator), Canadian literary translator